Xavier Grau i Masip (1951 – 30 May 2020) was a Spanish painter.

References

1951 births
2020 deaths
20th-century Spanish painters
20th-century Spanish male artists
21st-century Spanish painters
21st-century Spanish male artists